SMCRA may refer to:

Service Members Civil Relief Act, a United States federal law
Surface Mining Control and Reclamation Act of 1977, a United States federal law